Kevin Moore (born 1964) is an independent art historian and curator. His work focuses on the history of photography and contemporary art. Moore earned a Ph.D. in art history in 2002 from Princeton University and has worked in curatorial departments at the Metropolitan Museum of Art and the Fogg Art Museum, Harvard University.

Moore has collaborated with numerous institutions, including the Cincinnati Art Museum; the Princeton University Art Museum;  the de Young Museum, San Francisco;  the Centre Pompidou, Paris;  and the Hayward Gallery, London.

He has lectured at: Princeton University; the Metropolitan Museum of Art, New York; The Frick Collection, New York; Parsons The New School for Design, New York; Musée d'Orsay, Paris; Université de Paris, Diderot; and l'Ecole des Hautes Etudes en Sciences Sociales, Paris.

He  has appeared in two documentaries on photography produced by the BBC.

Books (author) 

 (2012) Real to Real: Photographs from the Traina Collection. Fine Arts Museums of San Francisco. 
 (2012) Jacques Henri Lartigue: L'invention d'un artiste. Editions Textuel. 
 (2010) Starburst: Color Photography in America 1970-1980. Hatje Cantz. 
 (2004) Jacques Henri Lartigue: The Invention of an Artist. Princeton University Press.

Books (contributing author) 

 (2013) Elena Dorfman: Empire Falling. Damiani. 
 (2012) Robert Heinecken. Ridinghouse. 
 (2012) Histoire de l'art du XIXe siècle (1848-1914). Ecole du Louvre. 
 (2011) From Diversion to Subversion: Games, Play, and Twentieth-Century Art. Penn State Press. 
 (2009) Words Without Pictures. LACMA/Aperture.  
 (2008) More Than One: Photographs in Sequence. Yale University Press. 
 (2008) American Paintings at Harvard, Volume Two. Harvard Art Museum/Yale University Press. 
 (2007) New York Rises: Photographs by Eugene de Salignac. Aperture. 
 (2007) L'Art de la photographie: 1839 à nos jours. Citadelles. 
 (2005) The Oxford Companion to the Photograph. Oxford University Press. 
 (2003) Lartigue: L'album d'une vie. Centre Pompidou/Seuil.

References 

1964 births
Living people
American art historians
American art curators
Princeton University alumni
Historians of photography